The 1940 United States Senate election in Delaware took place on November 5, 1940. Incumbent Republican U.S. Senator John G. Townsend Jr. ran for re-election to a third term in office, but was defeated by Democrat James M. Tunnell. This was the only seat that Democratic flipped during this cycle.

General election

Candidates
William F. Allen, former U.S. Representative from Seaford (Liberal Democratic)
James M. Tunnell, Georgetown banker and candidate for Senate in 1924 (Democratic)
John G. Townsend Jr., incumbent Senator since 1929 (Republican)

Results

See also 
 1940 United States Senate elections

References

Delaware
1940
1940 Delaware elections